FSV 08 Bissingen is a German association football club from the town of Bietigheim-Bissingen, Baden-Württemberg. The club plays in the tier five Oberliga Baden-Württemberg.

History
The club was formed in 1908 as Fußballclub Viktoria Bissingen. In 1919 the club merged with Sportvereinigung Bissingen but the new club was outlawed by the Nazis in 1934. The football department joined TV Bissingen after that but the latter was dissolved during the Second World War. The club reformed after the war and, in 1950, the football department left to form the current club, FSV 08 Bissingen. The club climbed as high as the tier four 2. Amateurliga in the 1950s but then disappeared into local amateur football for the next decades. FSV started its rise through the league system in 2000 when it won promotion to the Bezirksliga, followed by promotion to the Landesliga four years later. In the same season, 2003–04 it also made a losing appearance in the Württemberg Cup final against VfR Aalen. The club won promotion to the Verbandsliga Württemberg in 2006 and finished runners-up in this league in 2009. In the promotion round to the Oberliga it lost to TSG Weinheim but met the same club again three years later in its second attempt at Oberliga promotion. Successful on this occasion, FSV played in the Oberliga Baden-Württemberg in 2012–13 but finished second-last and was relegated again. The club played two more seasons in the Verbandsliga until it won the league for the first time and another promotion in 2015.

Honours
The club's honours:
 Verbandsliga Württemberg
 Champions: 2015
 Runners-up: 2009, 2012
 Landesliga Württemberg I
 Champions: 2006

Recent seasons
The recent season-by-season performance of the club:

 With the introduction of the Regionalligas in 1994 and the 3. Liga in 2008 as the new third tier, below the 2. Bundesliga, all leagues below dropped one tier.

References

External links
Official team site
FSV 08 Bissingen at Weltfussball.de

Football clubs in Germany
Football clubs in Baden-Württemberg
Association football clubs established in 1908
1908 establishments in Germany